Hypena polycyma is a moth of the family Erebidae first described by George Hampson in 1902. This species is known from South Africa, Kenya, Madagascar and Réunion.

It is dark brown, struck with black and has a wingspan of 34 mm. This species can easily be confused with Hypena vulgatalis.

References

External links
 "Hypena polycyma Hampson, 1902". Lépidoptères de La Réunion. With images

polycyma
Moths described in 1902
Moths of Madagascar
Moths of the Comoros
Moths of Réunion
Moths of Sub-Saharan Africa
Lepidoptera of South Africa
Lepidoptera of Kenya